The Park Inn by Radisson Berlin Alexanderplatz is the tallest building and the eleventh-tallest structure in Berlin and the 29th-tallest building and tallest hotel-only building in Germany.

History

The complex was built from 1967 to 1970 in the course of the redevelopment of Alexanderplatz when it was located in East Berlin. It was designed by the team of Roland Korn, Heinz Scharlipp and Hans Erich Bogatzky. However, the design as built differs in the shape and location of the tower on the lot from that envisaged in the 1964 plan for redevelopment of the square. The hotel opened as the Hotel Stadt Berlin, part of East Germany's Interhotel chain. It was a four-star hotel and mainly served for the accommodation of Comecon representatives. There was a panorama restaurant on the 37th floor and unusually fast elevators for the time and place.

In 1993, after German reunification, it was renamed Forum Hotel Berlin. 

In 2003, Rezidor Hotel Group became the operator of the hotel, which was renamed to Park Inn Berlin-Alexanderplatz and then Park Inn by Radisson Berlin Alexanderplatz. A casino, the highest in Europe, was located in the restaurant until November 2010.

There is a public viewing platform on the roof. All the rooms were refurbished starting in 2001 at a cost of € 20 million. Between May and November 2005 the entire  façade was replaced; the 6,800 new mirror-glass panes cost €3 million.

In December 2006 the hotel and the attached real estate parcels were acquired by Blackstone Group.

Base building
The base of the tower rises from a three-story commercial building that houses a Burger King, an ice cream parlour, and some small stores. The top floor offers direct access to the adjacent Galeria-Kaufhof. For 15 years, the ground floor and basement levels housed Berlin's first Saturn electronics store (like Galeria-Kaufhof, a division of Metro AG), but in March 2009 this relocated to a new adjacent building.

The future of the hotel and especially the base building are uncertain; plans to rebuild Alexanderplatz drawn up in the early 1990s envisage demolition of the hotel or at a minimum of the base building to enable erection of three new high-rises.

See also
List of tallest buildings in Germany
List of tallest buildings in Berlin
Oderturm
Jen-Tower
City-Hochhaus Leipzig
Fernsehturm
Kulturfinger

References

External links

 
 
 Official website of the Park Inn Berlin Alexanderplatz

Buildings and structures in Berlin
Skyscrapers in Berlin
Hotel buildings completed in 1970
Hotels in Berlin
Skyscraper hotels in Germany
Park Inn by Radisson
Rezidor Hotel Group